Danny Letner (January 3, 1928 – March 30, 2018) was an American racecar driver who won two races in what is now the NASCAR Cup Series.

Career
In 1951, Letner ran five NASCAR Grand National Division races in cars owned by his father, Bert. He earned two top-fives that year with a best finish of eighth. Letner then competed in a handful of races each year from 1954 to 1957, adding seven more top tens, including wins at Oakland and Tucson.

In 1954, Letner won two races and finished in second place in the NASCAR Pacific Coast Late Model standings. The next year, he won three races en route to a championship in his only full-time season. He won three of the twelve races he entered in 1957, his final season in the series.

In 1956, Letner ran 23 races in the inaugural season of the short-lived NASCAR Convertible Division, winning at Langhorne Speedway.

Letner retired from stock car racing in the early 1960s, but later took up off-road racing. He won the SCORE Parker 400 in 1989 at the age of 61, and would go on to finish tied for second in the championship standings that year.

In 2002, he was inducted into the first class of the West Coast Stock Car Hall of Fame.

Personal life
Letner was born in Downey, California. His son Marty and grandsons Kory and Harley have also competed in off-road racing.

References

External links
 

1928 births
2018 deaths
American racing drivers
NASCAR drivers
Off-road racing drivers
People from California
Racing drivers from California
Sportspeople from Downey, California